Alkalibacterium is a genus in the phylum Bacillota (Bacteria).

Etymology
The generic name Alkalibacterium derives from: Latin alkali (ashes of saltwort) alkali; and bacterium, a small rod, to give "a bacterium living under alkaline conditions".

Species
The genus contains eleven species:
 A. gilvum Ishikawa et al. 2013
 A. iburiense Nakajima et al. 2005, named for  Iburi, the place where the micro-organism was isolated
 A. indicireducens Yumoto et al. 2008, with indicireducens meaning indigo-reducing
 A. kapii Ishikawa et al. 2009, kapii meaning of ka-pi, a Thai fermented shrimp paste
 A. olivapovliticus corrig. Ntougias and Russell 2001, type species of the genus, with olivapovliticus meaning pertaining to the waste of the olives
 A. olivoapovliticus Ntougias and Russell 2001
 A. pelagium Ishikawa et al. 2009, pelagium, of the sea, marine
 A. psychrotolerans Yumoto et al. 2004, with psychrotolerans meaning tolerating a cold environment
 A. putridalgicola Ishikawa et al. 2009, from putridalgicola meaning dweller on putrid marine algae
 A. subtropicum shikawa et al. 2011
 A. thalassium Ishikawa et al. 2009 with thalassium  meaning of/from the sea

References

Lactobacillales
Bacteria genera